The Little Dragoon Mountains, are included in the Douglas Ranger District of Coronado National Forest, in Cochise County, Arizona.

The summit of the range is the center peak of the three Mae West Peaks, 6 miles northwest of Dragoon, Arizona.

Interstate 10 passes through the Texas Canyon area approximately three miles to the southeast of the Little Dragoon ridgeline.

See also
 Dragoon Mountains

References

Mountain ranges of Cochise County, Arizona
Coronado National Forest
Mountain ranges of Arizona